Elijah J. "E. J." Barthel  (born February 1, 1985) is a former American football fullback and current running backs coach for the Nebraska Cornhuskers. He was signed by the Las Vegas Locomotives as an undrafted free agent in 2009. He played college football at Massachusetts.

Barthel grew up in East Rutherford, New Jersey and attended Henry P. Becton Regional High School.

College years
Barthel played his first three years at Rutgers University.  He redshirted his Freshman year and was injured as a redshirt Freshman. His Sophomore year he played in 2 games.  Barthel transferred to UMass, along with Tight end Brad Listorti, as a Junior and played in all 15 games, starting 3.  He rushed twice for 7 yards and had a catch for 20.  He was a major contributor on special teams and had 4 tackles as UMass made it to the National Championship that year in 2006.  As a senior Barthel battled injuries and only registered 1 rush of 5 yards and 1 catch for 4 yards.

Professional career

New York Giants
Barthel had a tryout with the New York Giants but was not signed by the team.

Las Vegas Locomotives
Barthel signed with the Locos for the 2009 season where he teamed with fellow UMass football alum Marcel Shipp.

References

External links
Just Sports Stats
UMass Minutemen bio

1985 births
Living people
American football fullbacks
People from East Rutherford, New Jersey
Sportspeople from Santa Cruz, California
Players of American football from New Jersey
Las Vegas Locomotives players
UMass Minutemen football players
Howard Bison football coaches
UConn Huskies football coaches